North/Clybourn is an "L" station on the CTA's Red Line. It is a subway station with two side platforms, located at 1599 North Clybourn Avenue, in the Near North Side neighborhood of Chicago, at the southeastern edge of the commercial Clybourn Corridor. North/Clybourn station is located at the intersection of North Avenue, Halsted Street, and Clybourn Avenue. North/Clybourn was opened on October 17, 1943.

History

Apple advertising rights
On August 12, 2009, the Chicago Transit Board approved an ordinance granting Apple Inc. advertising rights to the station and the exclusive lease of the bus turnaround for nearly ten years in exchange for refurbishing and landscaping both. The project was to be completed by the end of 2010, and the amount paid by Apple to refurbish the station and bus turnaround was not to exceed $3.897 million.

Bus connections
CTA
  8 Halsted 
  N9 Ashland Night Bus (Owl Service) 
  72 North

Image gallery

Notes and references

Notes

References

External links

 North/Clybourn Station Page at Chicago-'L'.org
 Train schedule (PDF) at CTA official site
North/Clybourn Station Page CTA official site
North Avenue and Clybourn Street entrance from Google Maps Street View

CTA Red Line stations
Railway stations in the United States opened in 1943